Abolfazl Salabi (28 November 1924 – 26 April 2020) was an Iranian basketball player. He competed in the men's tournament at the 1948 Summer Olympics.

References

External links
 

1924 births
2020 deaths
Iranian men's basketball players
Olympic basketball players of Iran
Basketball players at the 1948 Summer Olympics
Asian Games medalists in basketball
Basketball players at the 1951 Asian Games
Asian Games bronze medalists for Iran
Medalists at the 1951 Asian Games
Place of birth missing